Arlington Apartments may refer to:

in Canada
Arlington Apartments, Edmonton

in the United States
Arlington Apartments (Waukesha, Wisconsin), listed on the National Register of Historic Places